The London and Lancashire Life Building was built in 1898 by the architect Edward Maxwell for the London and Lancashire Life Association of Scotland. The Beaux-Arts structure was later used as the head office for Lord Beaverbrook, the New Brunswick-born magnate and later Minister of Supply under Prime Minister Sir Winston Churchill.

References

Further reading
Rémillard, François, Old Montreal - A Walking Tour, Ministère des Affaires culturelles du Québec, 1992

Beaux-Arts architecture in Canada
Office buildings in Montreal
Old Montreal
Buildings and structures completed in 1898
1898 establishments in Quebec